The Midcontinent Rift System (MRS) or Keweenawan Rift is a  long geological rift in the center of the North American continent and south-central part of the North American plate.  It formed when the continent's core, the North American craton, began to split apart during the Mesoproterozoic era of the Precambrian, about 1.1 billion years ago.  The rift failed, leaving behind thick layers of igneous  rock that are exposed in its northern reaches, but buried beneath later sedimentary formations along most of its western and eastern arms. Those arms meet at Lake Superior, which is contained within the rift valley.  The lake's north shore in Ontario and Minnesota defines the northern arc of the rift.  From the lake, the rift's eastern arm trends south to central lower Michigan, and possibly into Indiana, Ohio, Kentucky, Tennessee, and Alabama.  The western arm runs from Lake Superior southwest through portions of Wisconsin, Minnesota, Iowa, and Nebraska to northeastern Kansas, and possibly into Oklahoma.

Formation and failure

The rock formations created by the rift included gabbro and granite intrusive rocks and basalt lavas.  In the Lake Superior region, the upwelling of this molten rock may have been the result of a hotspot which produced a triple junction.  The hotspot domed the rocks of the Lake Superior area. Voluminous basaltic lava flows erupted from the central axis of the rift, similar to the present-day rifting underway in the Afar Depression of the East African Rift system.  

The southwest and southeast extensions represent two arms of the triple junction while a third failed arm extends north into Ontario as the Nipigon Embayment. This failed arm includes Lake Nipigon, Ontario.

The rift system may have been the result of extensional forces behind the continental collision of the Grenville Orogeny to the east which in part overlaps the timing of the rift development. Later compressive forces from the Grenville Orogeny likely played a major role in the rift's failure and closure.  Had the rifting process continued, the eventual result would have been sundering of the North American craton and creation of a sea. The Midcontinent Rift appears to have progressed almost to the point where the ocean intruded. But after about 15–22 million years the rift failed. The Midcontinent Rift is the deepest closed or healed rift yet discovered; no known deeper rift ever failed to become an ocean.

The rift today

Lake Superior occupies a basin created by the rift. Near that lake, rocks produced by the rift can be found on the surface of Isle Royale and the Keweenaw Peninsula of the Upper Peninsula of Michigan, northwest Wisconsin, and on the North Shore of Superior in Minnesota and Ontario. Where buried, the rift has been mapped by gravity anomalies (its dense basaltic rock increases gravity locally),
aeromagnetic surveys, and seismic data.

A slightly older but possibly related geologic feature is the  Mackenzie Large Igneous Province in Canada, which extends from the Arctic in Nunavut to near the Great Lakes in Northwestern Ontario.

Natural resources

The Proterozoic Nonesuch Shale formation in the Keweenawan Rift contains enough organic carbon (greater than 0.5%) to be considered a potential source rock for petroleum. Oil identified as Precambrian has been found seeping out of the Nonesuch Shale in the White Pine mine in Michigan. A few deep wells were drilled to explore for oil and gas in rift rocks as far southwest as Kansas. No oil and gas were found, but the explorations did make some deep rock samples available. In 1987 Amoco also drilled a  dry hole that penetrated rift sediments in Iowa.<ref>"Exploring the Midcontinent Rift". Iowa Geological Survey Resource Information Fact Sheet 2006-2.</ref>

The Michigan Copper Country in the Upper Peninsula and Isle Royale contains major native copper deposits in Keweenawan-age rocks associated with the rift.  A copper mining industry was developed in Precolumbian times, reactivated in the 1840s and continued for more than a century.  Some low-grade copper and nickel deposits, among the largest in the world, also exist in the Duluth Complex north of the lake.  Once thought to be uneconomic to mine, these deposits have attracted renewed interest from resource companies.

Gallery

See also

Geology of Ontario

References

External links
 "Mineral Deposits of the Midcontinent Rift System".  United States Geological Survey Mineral Resources Program, Eastern Mineral and Environmental Resources Science Center.  A detailed and well-illustrated resource focusing on the mineral resources of the Midcontinent Rift and its geologic history.
 Stein, Seth et al. (2016) "New Insights into North America’s Midcontinent Rift".  Eos'', 97, https://doi.org/10.1029/2016EO056659.

Aulacogens
Geologic provinces of the United States
Geology of Alabama
Geology of Indiana
Geology of Iowa
Geology of Kansas
Geology of Kentucky
Geology of Michigan
Geology of Minnesota
Geology of Nebraska
Geology of Ohio
Geology of Oklahoma
Geology of Ontario
Geology of Tennessee
Geology of Wisconsin
Mesoproterozoic rifts and grabens
Large igneous provinces